Quagga is a network routing software suite providing implementations of Open Shortest Path First (OSPF), Routing Information Protocol (RIP), Border Gateway Protocol (BGP) and IS-IS for Unix-like platforms, particularly Linux, Solaris, FreeBSD and NetBSD.

Quagga is distributed under the terms of the GNU General Public License (GPL).

In April 2017, FRRouting forked from Quagga aiming for a more open and faster development.

Name
The project takes its name from the quagga, an extinct sub-species of the African zebra. Quagga is a fork of the GNU Zebra project which was developed by Kunihiro Ishiguro and which was discontinued in 2005. The Quagga tree aims to build a more involved community for Quagga than the centralized development-model which GNU Zebra followed.

Components
The Quagga architecture consists of a core daemon (zebra) which is an abstraction layer to the underlying Unix kernel and presents the Zserv API over a Unix-domain socket or TCP socket to Quagga clients. The Zserv clients typically implement a routing protocol and communicate routing updates to the zebra daemon. Existing Zserv clients are:
ospfd, implementing Open Shortest Path First (OSPFv2)
isisd, implementing Intermediate System to Intermediate System (IS-IS)
ripd, implementing Routing Information Protocol (RIP) version 1 and 2;
ospf6d, implementing Open Shortest Path First (OSPFv3) for IPv6
ripngd, implementing Routing Information Protocol (RIPng) for IPv6
bgpd, implementing Border Gateway Protocol (BGPv4+), including address family support for IP multicast and IPv6
pimd, implementing Protocol Independent Multicast (PIM-SSM) for Source-specific multicast

Additionally, the Quagga architecture has a rich development library to facilitate the implementation of protocol and client software with consistent configuration and administrative behavior.

Google has contributed to improvements to the IS-IS protocol and added BGP multipath support.

See also

 Bird Internet routing daemon
 List of open source routing platforms
 XORP

References

External links
 Quagga Mailing Lists

Free routing software